Elachista sapphirella is a moth of the family Elachistidae. It is found in south-eastern New South Wales, the Australian Capital Territory and Victoria.

The forewings are bluish grey for males and dark grey with four white markings for females. The hindwings are grey.

Larvae have been reared from an unidentified Poaceae species.

References

Moths described in 2011
sapphirella
Moths of Australia
Taxa named by Lauri Kaila